The Polish National Time Trial Championship is a road bicycle race that takes place inside the Polish National Road Cycling Championships, and decides the best cyclist in this type of race. The first edition took place in 1970, and was won by Jan Magiera. The current men's champion is Maciej Bodnar, who has won the race a record eight times (tied with Tadeusz Mytnik). The current women's champion is Agnieszka Skalniak-Sójka.

Men

Elite

U23

Women

Elite

References

External links
Past winners on cyclingarchives.com

National road cycling championships
Cycle races in Poland
Recurring sporting events established in 1970
1970 establishments in Poland
National championships in Poland